Internet slang (also called Internet shorthand, cyber-slang, netspeak, digispeak or chatspeak) is a non-standard or unofficial form of language used by people on the Internet to communicate to one another. An example of Internet slang is "LOL" meaning "laugh out loud". Since Internet slang is constantly changing, it is difficult to provide a standardized definition. However, it can be understood to be any type of slang that Internet users have popularized, and in many cases, have coined. Such terms often originate with the purpose of saving keystrokes or to compensate for small character limits. Many people use the same abbreviations in texting, instant messaging, and social networking websites. Acronyms, keyboard symbols, and abbreviations are common types of Internet slang. New dialects of slang, such as leet or Lolspeak, develop as ingroup Internet memes rather than time savers. Many people also use Internet slang in face-to-face, real life communication.

Creation and evolution

Origins
Internet slang originated in the early days of the Internet with some terms predating the Internet. The earliest forms of Internet slang assumed people's knowledge of programming and commands in a specific language. Internet slang is used in chat rooms, social networking services, online games, video games and in the online community. Since 1979, users of communications networks like Usenet created their own shorthand.

Motivations
The primary motivation for using a slang unique to the Internet is to ease communication. However, while Internet slang shortcuts save time for the writer, they take two times as long for the reader to understand, according to a study by the University of Tasmania. On the other hand, similar to the use of slang in traditional face-to-face speech or written language, slang on the Internet is often a way of indicating group membership.

Internet slang provides a channel which facilitates and constrains the ability to communicate in ways that are fundamentally different from those found in other semiotic situations. Many of the expectations and practices which we associate with spoken and written language are no longer applicable. The Internet itself is ideal for new slang to emerge because of the richness of the medium and the availability of information. Slang is also thus motivated for the "creation and sustenance of online communities". These communities, in turn, play a role in solidarity or identification or an exclusive or common cause.

David Crystal distinguishes among five areas of the Internet where slang is used- The Web itself, email, asynchronous chat (for example, mailing lists), synchronous chat (for example, Internet Relay Chat), and virtual worlds. The electronic character of the channel has a fundamental influence on the language of the medium. Options for communication are constrained by the nature of the hardware needed in order to gain Internet access. Thus, productive linguistic capacity (the type of information that can be sent) is determined by the preassigned characters on a keyboard, and receptive linguistic capacity (the type of information that can be seen) is determined by the size and configuration of the screen. Additionally, both sender and receiver are constrained linguistically by the properties of the internet software, computer hardware, and networking hardware linking them. Electronic discourse refers to writing that is "very often reads as if it were being spoken – that is, as if the sender were writing talking".

Types of slang

Internet slang does not constitute a homogeneous language variety. Rather, it differs according to the user and type of Internet situation. Audience design occurs in online platforms, and therefore online communities can develop their own sociolects, or shared linguistic norms.

Within the language of Internet slang, there is still an element of prescriptivism, as seen in style guides, for example Wired Style, which are specifically aimed at usage on the Internet. Even so, few users consciously heed these prescriptive recommendations on CMC, but rather adapt their styles based on what they encounter online. Although it is difficult to produce a clear definition of Internet slang, the following types of slang may be observed. This list is not exhaustive.

Type of Slang: African American Vernacular (AAVE) 
Black slang, commonly known as African American Vernacular (AAVE), has a long history that often dates back to slavery. The use of AAVE was used as a way for those within the community to have private conversations. These conversations were often encrypted in code so that those who did not understand its linguistics would not understand what was being said.  Black slang has not only been dismissed but it has also been mocked.  The approach of Black linguists studying AAVE is a vital part of history and one of the driving factors to internet slang.

On applications such as Twitter , Facebook, Tumblr, and Instagram AAVE is commonly used as a way of expression, it is also used in circumstances that express an exaggerated moment in time. With its rapid popularity on these applications and Black individuals being the demographic tied to this vernacular many non-black internet users have found ways to add certain vocabulary commonly used in AAVE to add into their vocabulary to be seen as more immersed in Black culture while also dismissing the lineage of the vernacular. With social media's advancement in ethnographically informed research will allow users online and the social media sphere to de-stigmatize the view on AAVE and how it is not supposed to be used as a way to be different because many of those who are not associated with being apart of the Black community do not understand the significance and how it connects to Black individuals and their identity. Creating a safe space will also stop AAVE from being stolen in internet realms and misinterpreted.

The AAVE vernacular associated with the Black community has been adopted and coined by the Gen Z demographic. The increase use of this vernacular has gained further popularity especially on the app TikTok with all of these elements combined many individuals within the internet sphere have added some of these vernacular into their vocabulary and many of these lingo's are often misused by non-black individuals and overused. The excessive use of these vernaculars by non-black individuals are misused in the incorrect contexts and with those circumstances these vernaculars are seen as trends. The overexposure and misuse of this vernacular should not be seen as a trend it is a language that has culture and assigning meanings.

While AAVE is popular on social media apps, newspaper outlets that pertain to entertainment segments also have culturally implemented AAVE into articles. Numerous verbal expressions are often added into these articles to add an heightened emotional connection that allows the reader to become more engaged with the articles whether the understand the meanings of those words or not.

AAVE is more acceptable in entertainment and editorial spaces because of the feeling and excitement that comes from the sentence structures in which the contexts fits into. With the advancement of technology and language it is often modified and digestible, and discredited. These spaces profit from the vernacular of Black people and give the illusion that AAVE is being accepted however it is mocked and changed in order to garner more of an audience and claim it as something other than Black vernacular. 

The emergence and advancement of digital culture has allowed AAVE vernacular to be more known within mediated spaces. The adoption of these slang's and many other vernaculars that are used throughout the years are able to be understood more now by the research conducted and the impact they have on cultural development. However understanding its importance and the significance that is serves is greater than using these vernaculars as a way to be seen as different. The identity in which they possess within certain demographic communities are to be expressed freely as well as encouraged by other groups of people to show care and understanding to that aspect of their culture.

Views

Many debates about how the use of slang on the Internet influences language outside of the digital sphere go on. Even though the direct causal relationship between the Internet and language has yet to be proven by any scientific research, Internet slang has invited split views on its influence on the standard of language use in non-computer-mediated communications.

Prescriptivists tend to have the widespread belief that the Internet has a negative influence on the future of language, and that it would lead to a degradation of standard. Some would even attribute any decline of standard formal English to the increase in usage of electronic communication. It has also been suggested that the linguistic differences between Standard English and CMC can have implications for literacy education. This is illustrated by the widely reported example of a school essay submitted by a Scottish teenager, which contained many abbreviations and acronyms likened to SMS language. There was great condemnation of this style by the mass media as well as educationists, who expressed that this showed diminishing literacy or linguistic abilities.

On the other hand, descriptivists have counter-argued that the Internet allows better expressions of a language. Rather than established linguistic conventions, linguistic choices sometimes reflect personal taste. It has also been suggested that as opposed to intentionally flouting language conventions, Internet slang is a result of a lack of motivation to monitor speech online. Hale and Scanlon describe language in emails as being derived from "writing the way people talk", and that there is no need to insist on 'Standard' English. English users, in particular, have an extensive tradition of etiquette guides, instead of traditional prescriptive treatises, that offer pointers on linguistic appropriateness. Using and spreading Internet slang also adds onto the cultural currency of a language. It is important to the speakers of the language due to the foundation it provides for identifying within a group, and also for defining a person's individual linguistic and communicative competence. The result is a specialized subculture based on its use of slang.

In scholarly research, attention has, for example, been drawn to the effect of the use of Internet slang in ethnography, and more importantly to how conversational relationships online change structurally because slang is used.

In German, there is already considerable controversy regarding the use of anglicisms outside of CMC. This situation is even more problematic within CMC, since the jargon of the medium is dominated by English terms. An extreme example of an anti-anglicisms perspective can be observed from the chatroom rules of a Christian site, which bans all anglicisms ("" [Using anglicisms is strictly prohibited!]), and also translates even fundamental terms into German equivalents.

Journalism
In April 2014, Gawkers editor-in-chief Max Read instituted new writing style guidelines banning internet slang for his writing staff.

Use beyond computer-mediated communication
Internet slang has crossed from being mediated by the computer into other non-physical domains. Here, these domains are taken to refer to any domain of interaction where interlocutors need not be geographically proximate to one another, and where the Internet is not primarily used. Internet slang is now prevalent in telephony, mainly through short messages (SMS) communication. Abbreviations and interjections, especially, have been popularized in this medium, perhaps due to the limited character space for writing messages on mobile phones. Another possible reason for this spread is the convenience of transferring the existing mappings between expression and meaning into a similar space of interaction.

At the same time, Internet slang has also taken a place as part of everyday offline language, among those with digital access. The nature and content of online conversation is brought forward to direct offline communication through the telephone and direct talking, as well as through written language, such as in writing notes or letters. In the case of interjections, such as numerically based and abbreviated Internet slang, are not pronounced as they are written physically or replaced by any actual action. Rather, they become lexicalized and spoken like non-slang words in a "stage direction" like fashion, where the actual action is not carried out but substituted with a verbal signal. The notions of flaming and trolling have also extended outside the computer, and are used in the same circumstances of deliberate or unintentional implicatures.

The expansion of Internet slang has been furthered through codification and the promotion of digital literacy. The subsequently existing and growing popularity of such references among those online as well as offline has thus advanced Internet slang literacy and globalized it. Awareness and proficiency in manipulating Internet slang in both online and offline communication indicates digital literacy and teaching materials have even been developed to further this knowledge. A South Korean publisher, for example, has published a textbook that details the meaning and context of use for common Internet slang instances and is targeted at young children who will soon be using the Internet. Similarly, Internet slang has been recommended as language teaching material in second language classrooms in order to raise communicative competence by imparting some of the cultural value attached to a language that is available only in slang.

Meanwhile, well-known dictionaries such as the ODE and Merriam-Webster have been updated with a significant and growing body of slang jargon. Besides common examples, lesser known slang and slang with a non-English etymology have also found a place in standardized linguistic references. Along with these instances, literature in user-contributed dictionaries such as Urban Dictionary has also been added to. Codification seems to be qualified through frequency of use, and novel creations are often not accepted by other users of slang.

Present
Although Internet slang began as a means of "opposition" to mainstream language, its popularity with today's globalized digitally literate population has shifted it into a part of everyday language, where it also leaves a profound impact.

Frequently used slang also have become conventionalised into memetic "unit[s] of cultural information". These memes in turn are further spread through their use on the Internet, prominently through websites. The Internet as an "information superhighway" is also catalysed through slang. The evolution of slang has also created a 'slang union' as part of a unique, specialised subculture. Such impacts are, however, limited and requires further discussion especially from the non-English world. This is because Internet slang is prevalent in languages more actively used on the Internet, like English, which is the Internet's lingua franca.

Around the world

In Japanese, the term moe has come into common use among slang users to mean something "preciously cute" and appealing.

Aside from the more frequent abbreviations, acronyms, and emoticons, Internet slang also uses archaic words or the lesser-known meanings of mainstream terms. Regular words can also be altered into something with a similar pronunciation but altogether different meaning, or attributed new meanings altogether. Phonetic transcriptions are the transformation of words to how it sounds in a certain language, and are used as internet slang. In places where logographic languages are used, such as China, a visual Internet slang exists, giving characters dual meanings, one direct and one implied.

The Internet has helped people from all over the world to become connected to one another, enabling "global" relationships to be formed. As such, it is important for the various types of slang used online to be recognizable for everyone. It is also important to do so because of how other languages are quickly catching up with English on the Internet, following the increase in Internet usage in predominantly non-English speaking countries. In fact, as of January 2020, only approximately 25.9% of the online population is made up of English speakers.

Different cultures tend to have different motivations behind their choice of slang, on top of the difference in language used. For example, in China, because of the tough Internet regulations imposed, users tend to use certain slang to talk about issues deemed as sensitive to the government. These include using symbols to separate the characters of a word to avoid detection from manual or automated text pattern scanning and consequential censorship. An outstanding example is the use of the term river crab to denote censorship. River crab (hexie) is pronounced the same as "harmony"—the official term used to justify political discipline and censorship. As such Chinese netizens reappropriate the official terms in a sarcastic way.

Abbreviations are popular across different cultures, including countries like Japan, China, France, Portugal, etc., and are used according to the particular language the Internet users speak. Significantly, this same style of slang creation is also found in non-alphabetical languages as, for example, a form of "e gao" or alternative political discourse.

The difference in language often results in miscommunication, as seen in an onomatopoeic example, "555", which sounds like "crying" in Chinese, and "laughing" in Thai. A similar example is between the English "haha" and the Spanish "jaja", where both are onomatopoeic expressions of laughter, but the difference in language also meant a different consonant for the same sound to be produced. For more examples of how other languages express "laughing out loud", see also: LOL

In terms of culture, in Chinese, the numerically based onomatopoeia "770880", which means to 'kiss and hug you', is used. This is comparable to "XOXO", which many Internet users use. In French, "pk" or "pq" is used in the place of pourquoi, which means 'why'. This is an example of a combination of onomatopoeia and shortening of the original word for convenience when writing online.

In conclusion, every different country has their own language background and cultural differences and hence, they tend to have their own rules and motivations for their own Internet slang. However, at present, there is still a lack of studies done by researchers on some differences between the countries.

On the whole, the popular use of Internet slang has resulted in a unique online and offline community as well as a couple sub-categories of "special internet slang which is different from other slang spread on the whole internet... similar to jargon... usually decided by the sharing community". It has also led to virtual communities marked by the specific slang they use and led to a more homogenized yet diverse online culture.

Internet slang in advertisements 
Internet slang is considered a form of advertisement. Through two empirical studies, it was proven that Internet slang could help promote or capture the crowd's attention through advertisement, but did not increase the sales of the product. However, using Internet slang in advertisement may attract a certain demographic, and might not be the best to use depending on the product or goods. Furthermore, an overuse of Internet slang also negatively effects the brand due to quality of the advertisement, but using an appropriate amount would be sufficient in providing more attention to the ad. According to the experiment, Internet slang helped capture the attention of the consumers of necessity items. However, the demographic of luxury goods differ, and using Internet slang would potentially have the brand lose credibility due to the appropriateness of Internet slang.

See also 

 TL;DR
 Cyberculture: social culture contained and created within cyberspace
 Internet industry jargon
 English-language spelling reform
 Internet linguistics
 Internet meme
 Internet minute
 Jargon File
 Languages used on the Internet
 Lists of acronyms
 Netiquette
 Tironian notes, scribal abbreviations and ligatures: Roman and medieval abbreviations used to save space on manuscripts and epigraphs
 List of Generation Z slang

References

Further reading
 
 
 
 
  Alt URL

External links

 Dictionaries of slang and abbreviations:

 All Acronyms
 FOLDOC, computing
 InternetSlang.com
 SlangInternet.com
 Internet Slangs
 Slang Dictionary
 SlangLang.net
 Slang.net

 
Computer-mediated communication
Internet memes
Occupational cryptolects
Slang by language